Sudeep Sarkar is a professor and chairman of the Department of Computer Science and Engineering at the University of South Florida, Tampa. He was named Fellow of the Institute of Electrical and Electronics Engineers (IEEE) in 2013 for contributions to computer vision.

Scientific career 
Sarkar has made many influential contributions to the field of biometrics, specifically gait biometrics, burn scar and skin analysis, and other areas in computer vision, particularly perceptual organization, segmentation and grouping, and to the evaluation of vision algorithms.

Honors 
Sudeep Sarkar is a fellow of International Association for Pattern Recognition (IAPR), Institute of Electrical and Electronics Engineers (IEEE), American Association for Advancement of Science (AAAS), American Institute for Medical and Biological Engineering (AIMBE). In 2016, he was inducted into the National Academy of Inventors (NAI).

References 

Fellow Members of the IEEE
Living people
Fellows of the International Association for Pattern Recognition
Fellows of the American Association for the Advancement of Science
Fellows of the American Institute for Medical and Biological Engineering
University of South Florida faculty
Year of birth missing (living people)